Phrynobatrachus cryptotis is a species of frog in the family Phrynobatrachidae.
It is endemic to Democratic Republic of the Congo.
Its natural habitats are subtropical or tropical dry forest, moist savanna, rivers, swampland, freshwater marshes, and intermittent freshwater marshes.

References

cryptotis
Endemic fauna of the Democratic Republic of the Congo
Amphibians described in 1959
Taxonomy articles created by Polbot